Krauss-Maffei Wegmann GmbH & Co. KG (KMW) is an arms industry company based in Munich, Germany. The company produces various types of equipment as well as rail locomotives, tanks, self-propelled artillery, and other armoured vehicles.

KMW was formed in 1999 when the defense division of KraussMaffei Group was spun off and merged with Wegmann & Co. Since 2015, KMW is part of KMW+Nexter Defense Systems.

History
KMW's predecessor company, Krauss-Maffei, started in 1931 from a merger of the two Munich firms of Maffei (founded 1838) and Krauss & Co. (founded 1860). Both belonged to the leading German makers of locomotives of various types. Maffei also built other steam-operated vehicles and, later, manufactured vehicles with combustion engines, including locomotives, trolleybuses and buses. In the 1960s, Kraus-Maffei entered production of armoured fighting vehicles, starting with Leopard 1 tanks for the Bundeswehr.

In 1999 defense production was spun off and merged with Wegmann & Co to form Krauss-Maffei Wegmann. Wegman had a 51% stake and Mannesmann AG, Kraus-Maffei's holding company at the time, had a 49% stake. Siemens acquired Mannesmann's share in 2000.

Wegmann Unternehmens-Holding KG based in Kassel bought the Siemens stake in December 2010 to become the sole shareholder of KMW. The family holding is owned by about 26 silent partners. The partners are members of the families Bode, von Braunbehrens, von Maydell and Sethe and are all descendants of the firm's founders or the later owners of Wegmann & Co.

In 2015, Krauss-Maffei Wegmann merged with the French state-owned defence company Nexter Systems to form KMW+Nexter Defense Systems. KMW is now a subsidiary of a newly formed holding company, a 50% share of which is controlled by the owners of the KMW company.

Tank test track 
The company has been running a tank test route in Allach since 1964, the building law of which is controversial. When KMW applied for an expansion of the operating hours in spring 2018, this met with resistance in parts of the residential and the district committee.  At the end of 2020, the citizens' initiative "School instead of tank" submitted a petition to the Bavarian state parliament with a complaint against the test track.   In the still ongoing petition procedure, the Ministry of the Environment made the statement that there was no existing protection for the circuit on Ludwigsfelder Straße and that the system was not approved in terms of building law. In addition, in October 2021, a lawsuit was submitted to the Munich Administrative Court in October 2021. In mid -January 2022, IG Metall campaigned for the preservation of the route, since 1650 jobs were in danger without it.

Owner 
The owner of the KMW is the Familyholding Wegmann Betriebs-Holding GmbH & Co. KG. This belongs to around 26 silent partners. The partners are members of the Bode, Braunbehrens families, from Maydell and Sethe and all descendants of the company founders or the later owner of Wegmann & Co.

Products
By defense division of KraussMaffei:
 Leopard 1 main battle tank
 Leopard 2 main battle tank
 Panzerhaubitze 2000 (PzH 2000) self-propelled howitzer
 Flugabwehrkanonenpanzer Gepard self-propelled anti-aircraft artillery

By Krauss-Maffei Wegmann:
  armoured bridge layer (Leopard 2 chassis)
  armoured bridge layer (Leopard 2 chassis)
 Artillery Gun Module (AGM), a derivative of PzH 2000 which has been further developed into the Donar self-propelled howitzer
 Dingo 1 & 2 infantry mobility vehicle
 FLW 100 and FLW 200 remote weapon stations
 Grizzly highly protected vehicle
 GTK Boxer armoured fighting vehicle
 MARS tracked multiple rocket launcher
 GFF4 armoured 4x4 personnel carrier
 Mungo ESK armoured transport vehicle
 Puma infantry fighting vehicle
 Fennek armoured reconnaissance vehicle
 F2 wheeled armoured vehicle
  Terrier armored 4x4 personnel carrier

Gallery

References

External links

 Official website
 

Defence companies of Germany
Military vehicle manufacturers
Locomotive manufacturers of Germany
Manufacturing companies based in Munich